Natasha Leggero (born March 26, 1974) is an American comedian, actress and writer. She rose to fame after appearing as the host of the MTV reality television series The 70s House in 2005, and as a regular roundtable panelist on Chelsea Handler's late-night talk show Chelsea Lately from 2008 to 2014.

Leggero created the Comedy Central period sitcom Another Period (2015–2018) with Riki Lindhome, which she starred in as Lillian Abigail Bellacourt, a daughter of the fictional Bellacourt family. As a voice actress, Leggero has starred in several adult animated sitcoms, voicing the roles of Callie Maggotbone in Ugly Americans (2010–2012), Ethel in Brickleberry (2013–2015) and Shannon in Hoops (2020). She also starred in the short-lived NBC sitcom Free Agents (2011) as Emma Parker, in the Showtime comedy series Dice (2016–2017) as Carmen, and in the CBS sitcom Broke (2020) as Elizabeth. In 2022, Leggero released her first book, The World Deserves My Children. 

Her observational comedy has been noted by critics for its use of satire, as commentary on such themes as celebrity culture and social class.

Early life and education 
Leggero was born on March 26, 1974 in Rockford, Illinois and is of Italian and Swedish descent. Leggero was raised Roman Catholic, but converted to Judaism as an adult.

Commenting on her childhood, Leggero stated: "I would say [we were] lower-middle-class, but I feel like my mom would start crying if she heard that. But my dad was a used car dealer and my mother worked in a locksmith shop as the bookkeeper, and then they got divorced, and I do remember, like, nuns bringing us food—like big canned goods. And then, you know, we didn't really go on vacation–ever... I had so many jobs growing up: I mowed lawns; I worked at a grocery store; I had two newspaper routes; I worked at a catering place... I definitely hustled."

She began performing in plays at age 10 in Chicago. Leggero attended Rockford East High School and worked at a grocery store as a teenager.

After graduating from high school, Leggero attended Illinois State University, where she studied for two years and spent a semester studying abroad in England. While at Illinois State, Leggero auditioned for the Stella Adler Conservatory in Chicago and was accepted into the theater program. She then relocated to New York City to attend the conservatory, studying for two years. In 1996, she moved to Sydney, Australia with her then-boyfriend and lived there for a year before returning to New York to attend Hunter College, where she graduated in 2000 with a B.A. in theater criticism. She relocated to Los Angeles shortly before the September 11 attacks.

Career 
Leggero shot an unaired pilot called The Strip for NBC with Tom Lennon and Ben Garant from Reno 911! Along with Andy Kindler and Greg Giraldo, she was a judge on the 2010 season of NBC's Last Comic Standing, which was hosted by Craig Robinson. Leggero played Emma in NBC's 2011 sitcom Free Agents. From 2010 to January 2012, Leggero co-hosted The Lavender Hour podcast with comedian Duncan Trussell.

From 2010 to 2012, Leggero voiced the role of Callie Maggotbone on the animated series Ugly Americans. In 2012, she also appeared in six episodes of NBC's Are You There, Chelsea? as Nikki, who was Rick's (the bar manager's) ex-girlfriend. Leggero was featured in every first-season episode, starting with the second episode "Sloane's Ex".

She also played the sex-obsessed Haley in the web series Burning Love, a spoof of the TV series The Bachelor and The Bachelorette. In 2013, Leggero appeared in an episode of the Drunk History television series on Comedy Central.

On September 2, 2013, Leggero participated in the Comedy Central Roast of James Franco as one of the roasters. The following day, Brickleberry premiered its second season. Leggero voiced the busty ranger Ethel in place of Kaitlin Olson, who only featured in the first season.

Tubbin' with Tash debuted on October 2, 2013, on Leggero's YouTube channel. The premise of the show is Leggero interviewing guests while in a hot tub. In August 2015, she debuted her Comedy Central standup special, Live at Bimbo's (originally entitled Diamond Pussy), which was filmed in San Francisco.

In 2015, Leggero and Riki Lindhome created the Comedy Central series Another Period, which they also starred in together. The series premiered June 23, 2015, and was renewed for a second season, which premiered on June 15, 2016. On May 23, 2016, it was renewed for a third season, which aired in 2018. In 2016 and 2017, Leggero and husband Moshe Kasher embarked on The Honeymoon Tour, in which they performed stand-up shows and provided humorous relationship advice throughout the United States.

Leggero currently hosts Rat in the Kitchen on TBS, which premiered on March 31, 2022.

Her first book The World Deserves My Children, a collection of essays on motherhood in a post-apocalyptic world, was published by Gallery Books on November 15, 2022.

Comedic style 
Leggero's comedy has been characterized as observational, with frequent commentary on celebrity culture and class. Her approach to standup has been noted for its heavy use of persona, which largely relies on costumes and "an air of mock-refinement and elitism." Journalist John Wenzel wrote that Leggero's use of persona allows her to "indict the most bloated, superficial aspects of our culture." Maggie Lange of GQ noted:
All performers have a character to some extent, but Leggero is one of the few with a costume. She’s like a wolf in sheep’s clothing, but like a seasoned comedian in socialite’s clothing. She’s always been this way. Who is the most formally dressed being at every Roast? Natasha Leggero. Who is perhaps the only person to have ever worn long white gloves to the Laugh Factory? Natasha Leggero. It’s always like she’s going to another party. While other comedians are trying to out-casual each other, she’s sitting with impeccable posture, dripping diamonds, dripping disdain.

Personal life 
As of 2016, Leggero owns a home in Silver Lake, Los Angeles.

Between 2011 and 2012, Leggero dated comedian Duncan Trussell, with whom she co-hosted the podcast, The Lavender Hour.

In 2015, she married fellow comedian Moshe Kasher. During an October 3, 2017 interview with Stephen Colbert, Leggero announced that she and Kasher were expecting their first child. On February 24, 2018, on Instagram, Leggero announced the birth of their daughter.

Works

Stand-up comedy

Talk shows

Filmography

Film

Television

Web

Notes

References

External links 

1974 births
21st-century American actresses
Converts to Judaism from Roman Catholicism
Actresses from Illinois
American film actresses
American people of Italian descent
American people of Swedish descent
American stand-up comedians
American television actresses
American voice actresses
American women comedians
Hunter College alumni
Living people
Actors from Rockford, Illinois
Stella Adler Studio of Acting alumni
Comedians from Illinois
Jewish American actresses
Jewish American female comedians
21st-century American comedians
21st-century American Jews